Zdravko Lorković (3 January 1900 in Zagreb – 11 November 1998 in Zagreb) was a Croatian biologist, entomologist and geneticist.

Lorković was a professor at the University of Zagreb where he graduated in biology. He acquired a doctorate in biology in Ljubljana under Jovan Hadži. He studied the nucleus of cells and chromosomes, the origin and evolution of species and ecology.

Lorković was one of the first cytotaxonomists in the world and one of the pioneers of cytotaxonomy best known for his karyotype studies of butterflies summarised in Lorković, 1990 "The butterfly chromosomes and their application in systematics and phylogeny" in: .

He was the son of Ivan Lorković and the sibling of Mladen Lorković.

Sources
 
  - Obituary and bibliography.

1900 births
1998 deaths
Croatian entomologists
Croatian biologists
Lepidopterists
Academic staff of the University of Zagreb
Scientists from Zagreb
Burials at Mirogoj Cemetery
Members of the Croatian Academy of Sciences and Arts
Yugoslav zoologists
20th-century Croatian scientists